DePauw University is a private liberal arts college in Greencastle, Indiana. It has an enrollment of 1,972 students. The college has a Methodist heritage and was originally known as Indiana Asbury University. DePauw is a member of both the Great Lakes Colleges Association and the North Coast Athletic Conference. The Society of Professional Journalists was founded at DePauw.

History

Indiana Asbury University was founded in 1837 in Greencastle, Indiana, and was named after Francis Asbury, the first American bishop of the Methodist Episcopal Church. The people of Greencastle raised $25,000 to entice the Methodists to establish the college in Greencastle, which was little more than a village at the time. It was originally established as an all-men's school but began admitting women in 1867.

In 1884 Indiana Asbury University changed its name to DePauw University in honor of Washington C. DePauw, who made a sequence of substantial donations throughout the 1870s, which culminated in his largest single donation that established the School of Music during 1884. Before his death in 1887, DePauw donated over $600,000 to Indiana Asbury, equal to around $17 million in 2021. In 2002, the school received the largest-ever gift to a liberal arts college, $128 million by the Holton family.

Sigma Delta Chi, known today as the Society of Professional Journalists, was founded at the college in 1909 by a group of student journalists, including Eugene C. Pulliam. The world's first Greek-letter sorority, Kappa Alpha Theta, was also founded at DePauw in 1870. DePauw is home to the two longest continually running fraternity chapters in the world: the Delta chapter of Beta Theta Pi and the Lambda chapter of Phi Gamma Delta.

During World War II, DePauw University was one of 131 colleges and universities nationally that took part in the V-12 Navy College Training Program which offered students a path to a Navy commission.

As of July 2020, Lori S. White, previously vice chancellor for student affairs at Washington University in St. Louis, is the 21st president of DePauw University. White is the first woman and African American to serve as President of DePauw University.

Academics
DePauw University has an enrollment of 1,970 students. DePauw's liberal arts education gives students a chance to gain general knowledge outside their direct area of study by taking classes outside their degrees and engaging in Winter Term classes and trips. Its most popular majors, by 2021 graduates, were:
Econometrics and Quantitative Economics (83)
Speech Communication and Rhetoric (63)
Computer Science (35)
Biochemistry (31)
Psychology (27)
Sports, Kinesiology, and Physical Education/Fitness (23)

Rankings

DePauw has consistently been ranked as the #1 liberal arts college and university in the State of Indiana. In 2020, DePauw was ranked 46th among liberal arts colleges in the United States by U.S. News & World Report. DePauw is ranked #78 on Forbes magazine's 2016 rankings, which include all colleges and universities in the United States, and #14 in the Midwest. Money magazine ranked DePauw #415 in the nation in its Best Colleges 2019 list based on data including tuition fees, family borrowing, and career earnings.

Academic calendar and winter term
DePauw University's schedule is divided into a 4–1–4-1 calendar: besides the 15-week Autumn and Spring Semesters, there is also a 4-week Winter Term as well as a May Term. Students take one course during these terms, which are either used as a period for students to explore a subject of interest on campus or participate in off-campus domestic or international internship programs, service trips, or international trips and field studies. One survey of DePauw students found that over 80% of DePauw graduates studied abroad. Past internships for Winter Term include ABC News, KeyBanc Capital Markets, Riley Hospital for Children, and Eli Lilly and Company. Past off-campus study and service projects include "The Galapagos: Natural Laboratories for Evolution", "Ghost Ranch: Abiquiu, New Mexico", and A Winter-Term In Service Trip that builds an Internet Facility in El Salvador while learning about public health and health care.

Faculty
DePauw University has a student-faculty ratio of 9:1 and has no classes with more than 35 students.

Notable faculty members include:
Sunil Sahu, Leonard E. and Mary B. Howell Professor of Political Science and author of Technology Transfer, Dependence, and Self-Reliant Development in the Third World: The Pharmaceutical and Machine Tool Industries in India
Erik Wielenberg, professor of philosophy and author of Value and Virtue in a Godless Universe and God and the Reach of Reason: C. S. Lewis, David Hume, and Bertrand Russell
Ellen Maycock, professor emerita of mathematics, Johnson Family University Professor (2003–2007), author of Laboratory Experiences in Group Theory and Associate Executive Director of the American Mathematical Society (2005–2015)

School of Music
DePauw University has one of the oldest private institutions for post-secondary music instruction in the country. Founded in 1884, the school has about 170 students. The student-to-teacher ratio is 5:1 with an average class size of 13 students. The School of Music is housed inside the Green Center for Performing Arts (GCPA), constructed in 2007, which integrated and replaced parts of the former structure. The School of Music grants degrees in music performance, music education, and musical arts. The latter allows students to add an emphasis on the music business. DePauw music students can also double major in another field outside of music in the typical four-year period or can study a Bachelor of Music and a Bachelor of Arts in a five-year course. The DePauw Symphony Orchestra is an auditioned ensemble for both music and non-music majors. In 2019, the orchestra toured Japan. The DePauw University Chorus is an ensemble open to both music and non-music majors, while the DePauw Chamber Singers is much smaller and more selective. The symphony and both choirs make an international tour every other year during Winter Term.

Honors and Fellows Programs
DePauw students can apply for entry to five Programs of Distinction. There are the Honor Scholars and Information Technology Associates programs as well as three fellowships in Management, Media, and Science Research.

The Honor Scholar Program is an interdisciplinary journey for talented students who want the highest level of intellectual rigor. The program includes 5 interdisciplinary seminars and an 80–120-page honor thesis in the student's senior year.

Management Fellows are the top students interested in business and economics. The program includes special seminars, speakers, and a paid, semester-long internship during the junior year. Students have interned in private, public, and non-profit sectors. Past internship sites include Goldman, Sachs & Co., Chicago; Partners in Housing Development Corp., Indianapolis; Ernst & Young Global, New York; Cummins Inc. in India; Independent Purchasing Cooperative, Miami, Florida, and Brunswick Group, an international PR firm based in London.

Media Fellows benefit from DePauw's media tradition. In addition to interacting with leading contemporary media figures such as documentary filmmakers Ken Burns, Carl Bernstein, and Jane Pauley, who presented Ubben Lectures on campus, students have hands-on access to sophisticated media equipment.

Science Research Fellows use state-of-the-art equipment, work one-on-one with faculty members, participate in internships, make presentations at scientific meetings, publish in scientific journals and, in essence, have graduate-level science opportunities as undergraduates.

Students participating in the Information Technology Associates Program (ITAP) enjoy an opportunity to link their liberal arts education with technology know-how through on-campus apprenticeships and on- and off-campus internships.

The Environmental Fellows Program is designed to foster an interdisciplinary understanding of environmental issues.

Technology
DePauw University was rated the top liberal arts college among the "Top 50 Most Unwired College Campuses", according to a survey which evaluated all institutions of higher learning and their use of wireless technology. The survey was sponsored by Intel Corporation and was printed in the edition of October 17, 2005, of U.S. News & World Report. DePauw was also ranked the third most connected school in the United States in a 2004 Princeton Review analysis.

Media outlets on campus
The Pulliam Center for Contemporary Media houses the school's media facilities. This includes a television station, radio station, newspaper, and 2 magazines - all student-run. First published in 1852 as Asbury Notes, The DePauw is Indiana's oldest college newspaper. WGRE was ranked the #1 college radio station by Princeton Review's "America's Best Colleges" in 2010.

When school is in session, the Pulliam Center is open to students and faculty 24 hours a day, 7 days a week.

Campus

There are 11 residence halls, 4 theme houses, and 31 college-owned houses and apartments spread throughout the campus. The oldest building on campus, East College, was built in 1877 and is listed on the National Register of Historic Places. DePauw also owns McKim Observatory.

East College

A historic structure located at the center of campus,  The cornerstone for the building was laid on October 20, 1871. The building hosted commencement exercises in June 1874, and in September 1875 all college classes were moved to the building, according to the book, DePauw Through the Years. But work on East College continued until 1882 when the building's basement was completed. East College was placed on the National Register of Historic Places in 1975.

Libraries
DePauw has three libraries: Roy O. West Library (main library), Prevo Science Library (located in the Julian Science Center, named for alumnus Percy Julian), and Music Library (located in the Green Center for Performing Arts). Library holdings include approximately 350,000 books; 22,000 videos; 1,000 print periodical titles; access to over 20,000 electronic titles; 450,000 government documents; newspapers; and online databases.

Judson and Joyce Green Center for the Performing Arts

The School of Music is housed in the Judson and Joyce Green Center for the Performing Arts; the Communication and Theater Department is also located here. The GCPA has 29 soundproof practice rooms, three performing venues, a music library, teaching studios for large and small ensembles, multiple recording studios, Cafe Allegro, and an organ. Kresge Auditorium seats 1,400 and has a balcony to host big events, speakers, and ensembles. Moore Theater seats 400 and is the stage for musicals and theater productions. Thompson Recital Hall seats 200 and is for small ensembles and chamber music concerts.

 Janet Prindle Institute for Ethics 
Since 2007, the Janet Prindle Institute for Ethics has served as a place for reflection, discussion, and education at DePauw. Prindle sponsors events related to ethics and provides opportunities for students, faculty, and staff to engage in thoughtful discussions. The institute also publishes ethics related content through The Prindle Post and the Examining Ethics podcast. 

Campus life

There are more than 100 organizations on the DePauw campus that students can be involved in. DePauw students also participate in on-campus intramurals, college and student-sponsored musical and theatrical productions, and create local chapters of national organizations such as Circle K.

Many students engage in community service and other volunteer activities. Putnam County Relay For Life is organized by students and brings together the college and community. In May 2006, the Putnam County Relay for Life raised more than $215,000 for the American Cancer Society.

On August 2, 2010, Princeton Review ranked DePauw as the #10 party school in the US for the 2010–2011 school year, which includes all colleges and universities.

Greek organizations

DePauw's Greek system began just eight years after the founding of Indiana Asbury College in 1837. The Delta chapter of Beta Theta Pi fraternity was established here in 1845, Phi Gamma Delta (commonly known as Fiji) in 1856, Sigma Chi in 1859, Phi Kappa Psi in 1865, Delta Kappa Epsilon in 1866, Phi Delta Theta in 1868, Delta Tau Delta in 1871, Delta Upsilon in 1887, Sigma Nu in 1890, the Delta Rho chapter of Alpha Tau Omega in 1924, and Sigma Alpha Epsilon in 1949.

Women were first admitted to Indiana Asbury in 1867. The first Greek-letter fraternity for women soon followed. In January 1870, Kappa Alpha Theta was founded at DePauw as the world's first Greek letter fraternity known among women. Kappa Kappa Gamma established a chapter at DePauw in 1875. Notably, Alpha Chi Omega became the second Alpha Chapter established at DePauw, after Theta, when it was founded here in 1885.

Just under 70 percent of students at DePauw are affiliated with a Greek-letter organization.

Greek life
For 2014, DePauw University was again ranked #1 in Greek Life by the Princeton Review. U.S. News & World Report ranked DePauw #3 in the nation for the highest percentage of male students belonging to fraternities and #4 in the nation for the highest percentage of female students in sororities.

The Greek community consists of fourteen national social fraternities (eleven of which have houses on campus) and ten sororities (six of which have houses on campus). DePauw has an extensive and substantial Greek history, with both Kappa Alpha Theta, the first Greek-letter organization for women, and Alpha Chi Omega being founded at the school. The Lambda Chapter is the longest continuing chapter of Phi Gamma Delta.

Formal IFC (North American Interfraternity Conference) recruitment for men and Panhel (National Panhellenic Conference) recruitment for women is held early second semester. Membership intake for National Pan-Hellenic Council organizations (historically black Greek-lettered organizations) and Multicultural Greek organizations usually occurs in the fall and/or the spring. First-year students are not permitted onto fraternity or sorority property for a period of time at the beginning of each school year.

Greek-letter organizations that formerly maintained chapters on DePauw's campus include the fraternities Delta Chi, Delta Kappa Epsilon, and Lambda Chi Alpha, and the sororities Delta Zeta, Delta Delta Delta, Alpha Omicron Pi and Alpha Gamma Delta.

Controversy

In 2006, the national organization of the Delta Zeta sorority reorganized the DePauw chapter, reducing twenty-three of its thirty-five current members (including the chapter president) to alumna status and giving them six weeks to vacate the sorority house. Of the twelve remaining members, six chose to take alumna status. The Delta Zeta national organization explained that its decisions were based on member commitment, but the evicted members said that they were forced to take alumna status because the chapter members were perceived as physically unattractive and "brainy".
Subsequently, on Monday, March 12, 2007, DePauw President Robert G. Bottoms announced that the college would sever its ties with Delta Zeta's national organization, effective at the end of the 2006–2007 academic year. President Bottoms was quoted as saying, "I came to the conclusion that our approaches to these issues are just incompatible."

Athletics

The DePauw Tigers compete in the NCAA Division III North Coast Athletic Conference (NCAC). Every year since 1890, DePauw University has competed in American football against its rival Wabash College in what has become the Monon Bell Classic. The traveling trophy, a 300-pound train bell from the Monon Railroad, made its debut in the rivalry in 1932. The DePauw-Wabash series is one of the nation's oldest college football rivalries.

In 1933, head coach Ray "Gaumey" Neal led the DePauw Tigers football team to an unbeaten, untied, and unscored opening season. The Tigers compiled a 7–0–0 record and outscored their opponents 136–0. Neal nearly duplicated this feat in 1943, but DePauw, 5–0–1, finished the season with one scoreless tie and six points allowed in a different game. The only points surrendered that season was in a 39–6 victory over Indiana State and the only non-win was a 0–0 tie against Oberlin. The Tigers outscored their opponents, 206–6.

DePauw had been a member of the Southern Collegiate Athletic Conference from 1997 to 2011 and won numerous conference championships, most notably in women's basketball, where the school is a Division III power. DePauw's program had also won the conference's overall "President's Trophy" seven times in that span, including six consecutive President's Trophies from 2005 to 2006 to 2010–11. In 2007, the Tigers defeated Washington University in St. Louis to win the Division III title in women's basketball. The women's softball team won the regional title, advancing to the Division III College World Series for the first time in school history. Most notably in 2021, the DePauw softball team finished third at the NCAA Division III Softball Championship.

In 2012–2013, the women's basketball team won its second Division III National Championship with a 69 to 51 victory over the University of Wisconsin, Whitewater, in the title game in Holland, Michigan. The Tigers finished 34–0 on the season, which was the best basketball season at the Division III level for men's or women's basketball.

Over the years, DePauw has sent several players to the NFL, including Dave Finzer (1982), a punter for the Chicago Bears and Seattle Seahawks, and Greg Werner (1989), a tight end for the New York Jets. Former Tiger Basketball players include Clemson University Men's Basketball Head Coach Brad Brownell (1991) and former Butler and Boston Celtics head coach and current Celtics Director of Basketball Operations Brad Stevens (1999).

Traditions

Music

The DePauw University School of Music presents regular recitals by students and faculty and concerts by visiting artists, most of which are free and open to the public.

DePauw students also organize concerts for the campus community. Performers in recent years have included Dave Matthews, Train, The Black Eyed Peas, Ben Folds, Rufus Wainwright, and Guster. Past guests have included Billy Joel, Smokey Robinson and the Miracles, The Carpenters, America, Yo-Yo Ma, and Harry Chapin.

Society of Professional Journalists
On May 6, 1909, Sigma Delta Chi was founded by a group of DePauw University student journalists. The organization officially changed its name to the Society of Professional Journalists in 1988. Today it is the nation's most broad-based journalism organization, encouraging the free practice of journalism and stimulating high standards of ethical behavior. SPJ promotes the free flow of information vital to a well-informed citizenry; works to inspire and educate the next generation of journalists; and protects First Amendment guarantees of freedom of speech and press. In 2012, SPJ returned to the DePauw campus with the assistance of Eugene S. Pulliam Distinguished Visiting Professor of Journalism Mark Tatge "

Rector Scholarships
Since 1919, the Rector Scholar Program has recognized DePauw students of exceptional scholarship and character. To be named a Rector Scholar is to join a prestigious tradition of more than 4,000 graduates strong. Rector Scholarships are offered to the top academic applicants offered admission to DePauw. A limited number of full-tuition Presidential Rector Scholarships are available.

Ubben Lecture series
Endowed by a gift from Timothy H. and Sharon (Williams) Ubben, both 1958 graduates of DePauw, the speakers' series "brings the world to Greencastle". Begun in 1986 and presented free of charge and open to all, Ubben Lecturers have included Malala Yousafzai, Bill Clinton, Benazir Bhutto, Margaret Thatcher, Jane Goodall, Tony Blair, TV's Jimmy Kimmel, Elie Wiesel, Colin Powell, Indianapolis Colts quarterback Andrew Luck, Spike Lee and Mikhail Gorbachev.

Brad Stevens, head coach of the Boston Celtics and 1999 DePauw graduate, spoke on March 9, 2020. Condoleezza Rice visited campus on October 8, 2019.

The Ubben Series has hosted 114 events in its 33-year history.

Monon Bell Classic

Voted "Indiana's Best College Sports Rivalry" by viewers of ESPN in 2005, DePauw University and Wabash College play each November—in the last regular season football game of the year for both teams—for the right to keep or reclaim the Monon Bell. The two teams first met in 1890. In 1932, the Monon Railroad donated its approximately 300-pound locomotive bell to be offered as the prize to the winning team each year. Wabash leads the all-time series, 62–54–9; since the Monon Bell was introduced, Wabash leads 43–38–6.  The game routinely sells out (up to 11,000 seats, depending upon the venue and seating arrangement) and has been televised by ABC, ESPN2, AXS TV, and Fox Sports (where it has appeared for the past two years). Each year, alumni from both schools gather at more than 60 locations around the United States for telecast parties, and a commemorative DVD (including historic clips known as "Monon Memories") is produced (there are discs of 1977, 1984, 1993, 1994 and 2000–2018 games).

Boulder Run
The Boulder Run has become a tradition at DePauw University. Students, streaking from their respective residences, run to and from the Columbia Boulder, located in the center of the campus near the East College building. Students today perform the Boulder Run for a variety of reasons, though it was originally performed on the day or night of the first snowfall on campus by Phi Gamma Delta, the Greek house nearest the boulder. This tradition was mentioned in Playboy magazine's'' September 1972 issue. The DePauw police are usually tolerant of the tradition, but students have been arrested when caught.

Campus Golf
It is not unusual to see students playing a game of Campus Golf when the weather is nice. The game of campus golf requires a golf club and a tennis ball. Players attempt to hit their tennis ball against various targets on campus within a number of strokes. The game is similar to frisbee golf, where players attempt to hit targets ranging from trees to buildings with a frisbee.

Notable alumni

References

External links

 

DePauw University Athletics website

 
Educational institutions established in 1837
Liberal arts colleges in Indiana
Education in Putnam County, Indiana
University and college buildings on the National Register of Historic Places in Indiana
Buildings and structures in Putnam County, Indiana
Tourist attractions in Putnam County, Indiana
1837 establishments in Indiana
Universities and colleges affiliated with the Methodist Episcopal Church